is a Shingon sect Buddhist temple located in the northeastern portion of the city of Odawara, Kanagawa Prefecture, Japan. Shōfuku-ji is the 5th temple in the Bandō Sanjūsankasho pilgrimage circuit of 33 Buddhist temples in the Kantō region of eastern Japan to the Bodhisattva Kannon.

History
According to temple legend, Shōfuku-ji was founded in the Nara period by the priest Dōkyō for the soul of the deceased Empress Kōken, and housed an image of Kannon brought to Japan by the famed Tang dynasty priest Guanjin, which had been owned by the Empress.  However, no historical documents have survived to substantiate this legend, and the history of the temple is thus uncertain. The temple was relocated to its present location in 830 AD. Shōfuku-ji is mentioned in the Kamakura period story, Soga Monogatari, and enjoyed the patronage of the Go-Hōjō clan during the Sengoku period. The current Hondō dates from 1706, and is the oldest surviving structure of the temple, although the bronze bell is dated 1629.

At present, the temple belongs to the Tō-ji branch of the Shingon sect of Japanese Buddhism. Its honzon is a Juichimen Kannon Bosatsu .

External links 
 Entry on the Bandō Sanjūsankasho site 

Buddhist temples in Kanagawa Prefecture
Shingon Buddhism